Institute for Productivity & Human Resource Development (IPHRD) is an Iranian organization and a subsidiary of IDRO established since 1987.

Activities
The main activities of this institute are:
 Business Excellence
 Quality Management
 Human Resources and Human Resource Management
 ISO
 EFQM
 Training and Consultancy

It is also an EFQM member and is the first non-European assessor of EFQM.

This institute also holds the "Iranian National Productivity and Business Excellence Award", "Iranian Society of Human Resource Management" and "Human Resources Development Conferences" in Iran.

Iran Award
Iranian National Productivity and Business Excellence Award (or Iran Award) is an excellence award which is held every year from 2004 based on EFQM Excellence Model in Iran sponsored by most of large Iranian organizations authorities as well as Ministry of Industries and Mines.

Iranian Society of HRM
An Iranian society which work to increase the situation of HRM in Iran and also a member of SHRM.

HRD Conf
A yearly conference on Human Resource Development held from 2004.

See also
 IDRO, Industrial development and Renovation Organization of Iran.
 SHRM, Society for Human Resource Management.
 EFQM, European Foundation for Quality Management.

Related Sites
 IPHRD Official Website
 Iran Award Official Website
 Iranian Society of HRM Official Website

Service companies of Iran
Productivity organizations
Human resource management